Brezovica pri Stopičah is a settlement in the City Municipality of Novo Mesto in southeastern Slovenia. The entire municipality is part of the traditional region of Lower Carniola and is now included in the Southeast Slovenia Statistical Region.

Name
The name of the settlement was changed from Brezovica to Brezovica pri Stopičah in 1953.

References

External links
Brezovica pri Stopičah on Geopedia

Populated places in the City Municipality of Novo Mesto